King Abdulaziz Medical City is district general hospital in Riyadh, the capital city of Saudi Arabia, was established by a royal decree in May 1983. With a bed capacity of 690 beds, it provides all types of care to all National Guard soldiers and their families, starting from primary health care up to tertiary specialized care. In 2012, It became a recognized center on the international level in conjoined twin separation surgery. It is the first center all over the world with 100% success rate in twin separation surgery.

Recently, King Fahad National Guard Hospital with many other medical centers has been united to be part of the King Abdulaziz Medical City. Since its inauguration in February 2001; and within a short period, KAMC has been called a distinguished healthcare provider. In September 2004 there has been an expansion of the Rehabilitation Department with both occupational and physiotherapy units along with the IVF clinic and OB in 2003, and Medical Imaging, Laboratory, Pharmacy, and continuous renovation of patients’ wards. 

The facility includes Cardiac and Liver Center; Adult Intensive Care Unit (ICU), neuro ICU, Trauma ICU, Surgical ICU, Burn ICU, Intermediate Medical ICU, Medical Cardiac and the newly build Respiratory ICU; Dental, Ambulatory (Outpatient) Care, Long Term Care/ Rehabilitation, Emergency Care and Trauma Centers. Other adult and pediatric services provided include: Surgical and Medical wards, Obstetrics and Gynecology (Labor and Delivery, Oncology, Antenatal and Post Partum wards); Pediatric Oncology and Pediatric ICU, Neonatal ICU, Operating Rooms, Ambulatory Care Center, Home Health Care Program, VIP Wards, Royal Suite, College of Medicine and Nursing College.

See also
 List of things named after Saudi Kings
 National Guard Health Affairs
 King Saud bin Abdulaziz University for Health Sciences

References

External links
 

1983 establishments in Saudi Arabia
Hospitals established in 1983
Hospital buildings completed in 1983
Military hospitals in Saudi Arabia
Buildings and structures in Riyadh
Organisations based in Riyadh